The origin of Batman depicts the events that cause a young Bruce Wayne to become Batman. The core event (the murder of Bruce’s parents Thomas and Martha Wayne at the hands of Joe Chill) has remained fairly unchanged, but the aftermath and Bruce's journey to become Batman were not detailed until later years. The story first appeared in Detective Comics #33 (November 1939), and was retold in graphic novels such as Batman: Year One.

Story 

The character's origin was first depicted in Detective Comics #33 (Nov. 1939), unfolding in a two-page story that establishes the brooding persona of Batman, a character driven by the murder of his parents. Written by Batman co-creator Bill Finger, it depicts a young Bruce Wayne witnessing his parents' murder at the hands of a mugger. Days later, the child vows that "by the spirits of my parents [I will] avenge their deaths by spending the rest of my life warring on all criminals".

Batman's origin is later expanded upon in Batman #47. Bruce Wayne is born to Dr. Thomas Wayne and his wife Martha, two very wealthy and charitable Gotham City socialites. Bruce is brought up in Wayne Manor, and leads a happy and privileged existence until the age of eight, when his parents are killed by a small-time criminal named Joe Chill while on their way home from a movie theater. That night, Bruce swears an oath to spend his life fighting crime. He engages in intense intellectual and physical training; however, he realizes that these skills alone would not be enough. "Criminals are a superstitious cowardly lot", Bruce remarks, "so my disguise must be able to strike terror into their hearts. I must be a creature of the night, black, terrible ..." As if responding to his desires, a bat suddenly flies through the window, inspiring Bruce to craft the Batman persona.

Batman's origin is expanded upon once again in Detective Comics #235 (June 1956), which recasts the Waynes’ murder not as a random mugging, but an assassination. In this story, Batman learns that mob boss Lew Moxon hired Chill to kill the Waynes as revenge for Thomas testifying against him 10 years before hand.

Analysis 
Media scholars Roberta Pearson and William Uricchio, in their 1991 work The Many Lives of the Batman: Critical Approaches to a Superhero and his Media, also noted beyond the origin story and such events as the introduction of Robin, "Until recently, the fixed and accruing and hence, canonized, events have been few in number", a situation altered by an increased effort by later Batman editors such as Dennis O'Neil to ensure consistency and continuity between stories. After witnessing the murder of his parents Dr. Thomas Wayne and Martha Wayne as a child, he swore vengeance against criminals, an oath tempered by a sense of justice. Bruce Wayne trains himself physically and intellectually and crafts a bat-inspired persona to fight crime.

The driving force behind Bruce Wayne's character is his parents' murder and their absence. Bob Kane and Bill Finger discussed Batman's background and decided that "there's nothing more traumatic than having your parents murdered before your eyes". Despite his trauma, he sets his mind on studying to become a scientist and to train his body into physical perfection to fight crime in Gotham City as Batman, an inspired idea from Wayne's insight into the criminal mind.

In an interview promoting the release of The Dark Knight Rises, actor Christian Bale described the deaths of Bruce's parents as a source of arrested development. "The thing is, he is still that child, basically. [...] And the eternal problem that Alfred has with watching this guy who has no life. He’s put his entire life on hold, because he still does [feel that pain]. He’s got such fierceness in his mind and in his emotions that he just will not forget the pain of his parents. With most people it’s like time heals all wounds, but I think with him it’s like he doesn’t want to forget it. He wants to maintain that anger that he felt at that injustice, but equally wants to present this very vacuous, soulless persona to Gotham so that no one will hopefully suspect him. They’ll just think he’s just a spoiled bastard."

Another of Batman's characterizations is that of a vigilante; in order to stop the evil that started with the death of his parents, he must sometimes break the law himself. Although manifested differently by being re-told by different artists, it is nevertheless that the details and the prime components of Batman's origin have never varied at all in the comic books, the "reiteration of the basic origin events holds together otherwise divergent expressions". The origin is the source of the character's traits and attributes, which play out in many of the character's adventures.

Alterations 
Due to the many writers who have worked on Batman stories, and constant references due to the central importance of the murder to the Batman mythos, many of the factors concerning the event have been altered.
 The murderer is consistently identified as Joe Chill, although the mythos alternates between versions where Batman learns the killer's identity, and ones in which he never finds out. Chill has also alternated between being a mugger who randomly selected the wealthy Waynes, and a hitman who murdered them intentionally (the former is the most common interpretation).
 The reason given for Chill leaving Bruce alive has varied. Sometimes it was because Chill could not bring himself to kill a child, and sometimes because Chill heard a policeman's whistle, police siren, or a rapidly approaching policeman. Often, it is because of the cold, frightening look that Bruce gave Chill as he kneels beside his dead parents; Chill panics and runs away. In the version presented in The Untold Legend of the Batman, Batman theorizes that Chill, a hitman hired by gangster Lew Moxon, deliberately left Bruce alive to report that his parents were killed by a robber.
 The movie that the Waynes went to see has fluctuated between the 1920 version of The Mark of Zorro starring Douglas Fairbanks and the 1940 version starring Tyrone Power and Basil Rathbone. A third version has starred "Tyrone Fairbanks". Tim Burton's Batman has the Waynes leaving The Monarch Theatre having seen Footlight Frenzy. Batman Begins has the Waynes leaving an opera house showing Mefistofele at the time of the murder, which they leave early due to Bruce being frightened by the bat-like costumes, giving Bruce the additional guilt of leading his parents to Chill. In The Dark Knight's Visual Guide it says that Bruce would rather have seen The Mark of Zorro at a movie house.
 Actor Doug Bradley will be playing Joe Chill in the CW's Gotham Knights. In this version Joe Chill is set to be executed for the crime, but he claims he is only a patsy and may not be guilty of the crime.  The Court of Owls tries to push behind the scenes for his death.

Thomas and Martha Wayne are notable as two comic book characters who have remained dead. Since his death, Thomas has only appeared in the Batman series in flashback and in the occasional out-of-body experience or hallucination. His most significant appearance in this latter category is in the miniseries Batman: Death and the Maidens by Greg Rucka. In this story, Batman ingests an elixir given to him by Ra's al Ghul, and believes he is having a conversation with his dead parents. In Bruce's hallucination, his parents disapprove of his costumed crusade, wishing that he would put their deaths behind him and move on with his life. As she and Thomas depart, they assure Bruce that just because the passing of time has lessened his grief does not mean that he no longer loves them. As a result, Bruce is able to accept that he is Batman because he chooses to be, not because he has to be.

Consistent elements have included Thomas Wayne being murdered by a pistol, and Martha Wayne's pearl necklace being torn, with the pearls falling into the gutter. The murder takes place at 10:47 p.m. (Batman accesses the Batcave through Wayne Manor by turning the hands of a grandfather clock to this time.) In comic book continuity, the date of the murder has varied, although the 26th of June and September, the current canonical date, are the most significant examples varied.

Batman: Dark Victory depicts the Wayne murders as the main cause of much of the corruption and crime in Gotham City: once it became clear that even wealthy, important people could be murdered so easily, citizens began to lose faith in the police, and the police themselves started to lose faith in their importance, leading to corruption within the force.

Batman #430 includes a scene in which, on the day of his and Martha's murder, Thomas Wayne is having trouble with some investments, and is going to sell short. Bruce thinks that he needs some exercise to take his mind off of it and so offers to play catch with him, but Thomas angrily says no, striking him across the face. A hurt and resentful Bruce declares to his mother that he wishes Thomas were dead. Thomas takes the family to a movie to make it up to his son, and in an ironic twist of fate, Thomas and Martha are murdered that night. Bruce feels guilty for years afterward.

Alternative versions 

In the alternate history setting of Superman: Red Son, the unnamed parents of Batman are Soviet dissidents gunned down in front of their son by NKVD commissar Pyotr Roslov. This leads to their son growing up to become Batman, a crusader against the Soviet government and its leader, Superman.

In the crossover story arc Flashpoint, which creates an alternate reality, Bruce Wayne is the only victim of Joe Chill's mugging. Thomas Wayne appears as this reality's Batman and Martha Wayne as the incarnation's Joker.

In other media 
In Tim Burton's Batman, Joe Chill kills Bruce Wayne's parents with the help of his associate Jack Napier. Later in the film, Napier becomes the Joker after his first encounter with Batman; the two foes later realize that they “made each other”. 

In Christopher Nolan's The Dark Knight trilogy, Bruce Wayne's parents Thomas and Martha were murdered by low life mugger Joe Chill, who is arrested soon after. Fourteen years after the murder, Chill is paroled for testifying against his cellmate Carmine Falcone, who has Chill killed. Bruce decides to leave Gotham to train, meeting the League of Shadows led by the immortal assassin Ra's al Ghul. When refused to kill a man as his final task, Bruce burns down the League of Shadows headquarters, killing Ra's and escapes. He returns to Gotham and uses his training to become the vigilante Batman and rid Gotham of its rapid crime. The many villains he faces in the trilogy include Henri Ducard, who becomes Ra's al Ghul after Bruce killed the previous one, Scarecrow, the Joker, and Bane.

The 2014 television series Gotham depicts a re-imagining of Batman, featuring a twelve year old Bruce Wayne (portrayed by David Mazouz) whose parents are shot while exiting the Monarch Theatre screening of the 1920 version of The Mark of Zorro. This version includes a teenage Selina Kyle (portrayed by Cameron Bicondova) witnessing the crime from a distance. Bruce is assisted by Gotham City Police Department detective James Gordon (portrayed by Ben McKenzie) in finding the murderer of Bruce's parents. Eventually, Bruce discovers the criminal Patrick "Matches" Malone had murdered the Waynes, and was hired by an intermediary contractor known as "The Lady" who put out a hit for Thomas and Martha Wayne on the orders of Hugo Strange. Gordon shuts down The Lady's criminal empire and learns Malone's identity. After being confronted by Bruce, Matches commits suicide. Hugo Strange is arrested for his crimes, only to escape federal custody and goes on the run. In the series finale, Bruce becomes a bat dressed vigilante after leaving Gotham.

In Zack Snyder's Batman v Superman: Dawn of Justice, Bruce Wayne's parents Thomas and Martha were murdered by Joe Chill, when he was 9 years old. While seemingly hesitant, Thomas Wayne threw the first punch, attempting to beat back the mugger, but he was quickly shot and mortally wounded. Stunned, his mother joined the fight, attempting to wrestle the gun away. Her attempt also failed, leading to a sad look of surrender come upon her eyes right before she was shot herself, Bruce screaming in horror. With his last dying breath, Bruce's father called out his mother's name in a loud whisper, reaching out for the final time. Watching her life pass away even as the mugger ran off into the night. From then on, Bruce was raised by the Wayne family's bodyguard, Alfred Pennyworth. During the funeral for his parents, Bruce, overcome with grief, broke away from the service. As he ran, he stumbled across a decrepit area of the estate and fell into a cavern filled with numerous bats. This would later inspire him to use that fear to battle the criminal elements that took his parents' lives. After Batman defeated Superman in combat, moved to kill him with a kryptonite spear, Superman pleaded with him to "save Martha", causing Batman to pause in confusion and anger. When Lois Lane intervenes and explains that Superman meant his own mother, Batman relents and sets out to rescue Martha Kent.

In the 2019 film Joker, the Wayne family exits the theatre (which is showing Blow Out and Zorro, The Gay Blade) and are caught in the middle of a riot spurred by the Joker's actions. Thomas Wayne takes Martha and Bruce through an alley for safety, where a rioter shoots him and Martha dead as a way of striking back against the powerful in Gotham. Notably, Thomas is depicted in the film as being indifferent and hostile to those protesting the dismal living conditions in Gotham City, and the question of his paternity over the Joker (alias to Arthur Fleck).

In the Harley Quinn episode "Batman Begins Forever", the murder of Thomas and Martha Wayne is depicted as an infinite loop inside Bruce Wayne's mind as a reversed repressed memory. This is a satirical reference to the infinite amount of times' their murder has been portrayed in various media.

Reception 
Newsarama places Batman's origin as number two of the greatest origin story in comic books describing it as "one of the most tragic in all of comic books, [setting] the stage for countless copycats using the trope of a hero who suffers a great injustice, and spends the rest of his life seeking vengeance." Matthew Byrd of Screen Rant placed Batman's origin in the number one spot of greatest comic book origins.

See also 
Origin of Superman

Further reading 
2007 thesis on Batman mythos from Brigham Young University

References 

1939 comics debuts
Batman storylines
Batman